Ernst Freiherr Stromer von Reichenbach (12 June 1871 in Nürnberg – 18 December 1952 in Erlangen) was a German paleontologist. He is best remembered for his expedition to Egypt, during which the first known remains of Spinosaurus were discovered.

He described the following Cretaceous dinosaurs from Egypt: Aegyptosaurus, Bahariasaurus, Carcharodontosaurus, and the enigmatic theropod, Spinosaurus aegyptiacus. Stromer also described the giant crocodilian, Stomatosuchus.

The fossil bird genus Stromeria (now included in the genus Eremopezus) and the sauropod Paralititan stromeri were named in his honor (by Kálmán Lambrecht in 1929 and Smith et al. 2001, respectively). The majority of his fossil discoveries were destroyed during World War II, and only photographs of some specimens remain.

Biography
Ernst Stromer had an aristocratic standing in German society (the "Freiherr" in his name roughly equals "baron" in English); his father had been the mayor in his home city of Nuremberg, and his ancestors had been lawyers, courtiers, scientists, architects, and other leaders. Stromer had quite some distaste towards the Nazi party.

Ernst Stromer was married to Elisabeth Rennebaum (1886-1977) in 1920 and had three sons (Ulman, Wolfgang, and Gerhart), all of whom served in the German army during World War II . Two died during the conflict, while the third, Wolfgang, was taken prisoner by the Soviets and was believed to have died, until he was returned to Germany in 1950.

Egypt Expedition

Arrival

On 7 November 1910, Stromer arrived in Alexandria, Egypt, aboard the Norddeutscher Lloyd steamship Cleopatra. After a two day setback imposed by a temporary quarantine, the expedition set out by train to arrive in Cairo the next day.

After checking into the hotel in Cairo, Stromer found a letter of welcome waiting for him at the post office from the director of the Geological Survey of Egypt. Stromer visited the office of George Steindorff, a reputable German Egyptologist, as a matter of courtesy and to plan the future expedition.

On 14 November, Stromer went to meet with John Ball, the founder of the Desert Survey Department of the Geological Survey of Egypt. In that year, the survey had published the first topographic map of Egypt, and was finishing a geological map that was to be published in 1911. Both sources were invaluable to Stromer, now planning his upcoming expedition to Bahariya, an area of the Western Desert that was little known.

Richard Markgraf, a German guide who lived South of Cairo, met Stromer during the winter of 1901–1902, and got along very well. Markgraf was Stromer's Sammler, or fossil collector, for 10½ years, and became Stromer's friend. Markgraf, however, was often ill. It is unclear whether the cause was malaria, intestinal bleeding from typhoid, or chronic amebic dysentery.

The plan for the expedition contained three parts; first, Stromer and Markgraf would travel northwest from Cairo to Wadi el Natrun. After exploring the area for a few weeks, they would return to Cairo, replenish their supplies, and afterwards head south to Luxor to explore the eastern slopes of the Nile Valley. The last part of the expedition would be spent exploring the Bahariya Oasis.

Beginning of the expedition 
Stromer and Markgraf began the expedition with the goal of discovering fossil mammals to support Stromer’s theory of an African origin of humanity.

Stromer's 1910 journals from Wadi el Natrun reveal that he worked all through the day, hiking for miles, climbing hills, and hammering pieces of rock from outcroppings throughout the valley. He discovered sharks' teeth, broken shells of ancient turtles, and the occasional jaw of a prehistoric crocodile. Despite these discoveries his failure to uncover ancient mammals left him disappointed and he returned to Cairo.

Markgraf, who stayed in Wadi el Natron after Stromer’s return to Cairo, discovered the skull of Libypithecus markgrafi.

The second stage of the expedition took them to a location far up the Nile in December. This location yielded little success.

The third stage of the expedition was delayed due to Markgraf becoming ill and being unable to proceed to the Bahariya Oasis. Stromer found a dragoman who could function as a guide and translator.

On 3 January 1911, the expedition left for the Western Desert. The caravan was significantly slowed as they had to find grazing areas for the camels because one of the team members hadn’t bought fodder for the animals.

After more than a week of walking, they arrived in the Bahariya Oasis on January 11, 1911. Due to the inaccuracy of the understanding of the geologic history of the Bahariya Oasis in 1911, Stromer erroneously believed the oasis to date to the Eocene rather than Cretaceous.

Discoveries 
On 14 January, the weather eased and the expedition was able to begin. That first day, Stromer was able to find a fossilized shark vertebrae, fish teeth, and some petrified wood. On January 18, he found "three large bones which I attempt to excavate and photograph. The upper extremity is heavily weathered and incomplete [but] measures 110 cm long and 15 cm thick. The second and better one underneath is probably a femur [thighbone] and is wholly 95 cm long and, in the middle, also 15 cm thick. The third is too deep in the ground and will require too much time to recover." He also discovered that morning an ischium (one of the pelvic bones of a dinosaur), another vertebrae with "a convex end," and what he described as "a gigantic claw". He cut up his mosquito netting and soaked them in a flour and water paste, covering the two larger bones in this wrapping.

He moved the expedition to the area near Gebel Hammad the next day. Several dinosaur, fish, and shark bones were found there, but after little more was recovered, they packed up and, two days later, left again—this time for the village of Ghauraq.

On 18 February 1911, Stromer began his long trip back to Germany. Over the next few years, he would describe  his finds including the large spinosaurid, Spinosaurus aegypticus, and the carcharodontosaurid, Carcharodontosaurus saharicus.

Destruction of Stromer's collection
In 1944, towards the end of World War II, the vast majority of Stromer's fossil collection—including the only known (though incomplete) skeletons of Spinosaurus and Aegyptosaurus—was destroyed when the museum in which it was held in Munich was bombed by the Allied Royal Air Force during a raid.

References

Sources 
Nothdurft, William and Smith, Josh. Book. The Lost Dinosaurs of Egypt. Cosmos Studios, New York. 2002.
A Tribute to Ernst Stromer: Hundred Years of the Discovery of Spinosaurus aegypticus: Saubhik Ghosh: EKDIN, 11 and 12 July 2011 (www.ekdin.org)
Probst, Ernst: Der rätselhafte Spinosaurus. Leben und Werk des Forschers Ernst Stromer von Reichenbach. GRIN, München 2015

External links 
 
 Strange Science bio of Ernst Stromer
 Science Daily article confirming the rediscovery of lost Spinosaurus specimen photos

1870 births
1952 deaths
Scientists from Nuremberg
German paleontologists